Vishu is a 2022 Indian Marathi-language film directed by Mayur Madhukar Shinde and produced by Shree Krupa Productions. It was theatrically released on 8 April 2022.

Cast 

 Gashmeer Mahajani as Vishu 
 Mrinmayee Godbole as Arvi
 Aetashaa Sansgiri
 Sanjay Gurbaxani 
 Millind Pathak
 Vijay Nikam 
 Mansi Mohile

Reception

Critical reception 
Film received negative reviews from critics. Pipa News rate 2.5 out of 5 and given positive review for acting Gashmeer and Mrinmayi have acted well. Given the constraints of the story, there was no room for the actors to take a very different approach;  But whatever it is, they have done justice to their roles. Gashmir's work in the second half is remarkable.  Actress Aetashaa Sansgiri, who plays Arvi's sister, has also given a good performance. Malvan's shooting in the second half of the film is mesmerizing. The songs and music of the movie are better than the movie. The director has executed the technical aspects of the film perfectly. Suggests If the director had paid more attention to direction, the film would not have gone astray.

Mihir Bhanage of The Times of India rates 2.5 and said ''Vishu is a decent attempt that falters with the execution on screen''.

Soundtrack 
Music and background score is by Rishikesh Kamerkar, Songs are recorded by Adarsh Shinde, Rishikesh Kamerkar, Neha Rajpal, Sonal Naik and Veena Joshi. Lyrics are written by Mangesh Kangane.

Release 
Teaser of the film was released on 14 March and trailer on 21 March 2022.

The film was theatrically released on April 8, 2022.

External links

References 

2022 films
2020s Marathi-language films
Indian romance films
Indian romantic drama films